The 2018 Burnley Borough Council election took place on 3 May 2018 to elect members of Burnley Borough Council in England. This was on the same day as other local elections. One third of the council was up for election, and each successful candidate will serve a four-year term of office, expiring in 2022. These seats were last contested in 2014.

At the start of March 2017, Bill and Margaret Brindle (both Coalclough with Deerplay ward) acrimoniously split with the local Liberal Democrats, but continued to sit on the council as independents. David Roper also left the party and continued as an independent. In November four more Lib Dems (including Neil Mottershead and Mark Payne) left the party over its stance on Brexit, to form the Burnley and Padiham Independent Party.

State of the Parties 
The composition of the Council following the election was as follows:

Overall results

Results by ward

Bank Hall ward

Briercliffe ward

Brunshaw ward

Cliviger with Worsthorne ward

Coalclough with Deerplay ward

Daneshouse with Stoneyholme ward

Gannow ward

Gawthorpe ward

Hapton with Park ward

Lanehead ward

Queensgate ward

Rosegrove with Lowerhouse ward

Rosehill with Burnley Wood ward

Trinity ward

Whittlefield with Ightenhill ward

References

2018 English local elections
2018
2010s in Lancashire